Barbara McAlister may refer to:
 Barbara McAlister (diver)
 Barbara McAlister (mezzo-soprano)